Shaheed K. Woods (born Shaheed Kamal Jihad Woods) is an American actor, comedian born and raised in Jersey City, New Jersey. He is best known for A Gentleman, Midnight Delight, Life! Camera Action... earning him accolades.

Early life
Woods grew up in Jersey City and attended Fred W. Martin Elementary school.

Acting career
Woods first came to prominence with his lead role in Life! Camera Action... playing as Mike for which he won his first international award for the 'Best Supporting Lead Actor'. He first took to acting in theater, having done several local plays including 'Underneath It All' at Newark Symphony Hall. Having performed at several venues, members of the Newark art scene have dubbed him "The Beacon of Light". One performance was a fundraiser benefit for the documentary "Face of Darkness" hosted by Kenneth Todd Nelson and Squeaky Moore.  
After performing in several short films, he met filmmaker Rohit Gupta on the set of a short directed by a fellow alum of the New York Film Academy. It was then that they formed their friendship, and began discussing a short film project which ended up as the critically acclaimed film Life! Camera Action... marking Woods debut as lead in a feature.

Woods took to directing with the short play "Off the Bridge" written by Akua Doku. He then was selected to direct a reading with an all female ensemble cast titled "Rebirth of the Black Woman" in New York. He has also worked with Playwright Carol White several short plays. Any Minute Now, written by White, won first place in the Short Play Lab at Roy Arias studios in Manhattan. He has worked in the background on Pariah with Dee Rees and played the role of Meat in the pilot of an upcoming series titled "Boys and Girls".

Woods went to gain further acclaim with his lead role in the cult-comedy Midnight Delight winning acclaim and awards. He features in three vignettes in the film including "Epiphanation", "Free Will" and the voice of mouse as the main character in the "Animation" vignette of the film. Woods got noticed in Life! Camera Action... & Midnight Delight and was offered a prominent role by Fox Star Studios to feature in a Bollywood film A Gentleman which released worldwide on 25 August 2017.

Filmography

{| class="wikitable"
! style="width:40px;"| Year
! style="width:250px;"| Film
! style="width:150px;"| Role
! style="width:300px;"| Notes
|-
|2020
|! scope="row" style="background:#FFFFCC;"|Washington Irving: An American Original 
|Narrator (Self)
|(documentary feature - pre-production)
|-
|2018
|! scope="row" style="background:#FFFFCC;"|George Washington: The Farewell Address 
|Narrator (Self)
|(documentary feature - filming)
|-
|rowspan="3|2017
|A Gentleman
| as Koko
| (bollywood feature - Fox studio presentation - released worldwide Aug 25, 2017) 
|-
|The Killer Contract
| 
|(feature)
|-
|The Black Eagle of Harlem
|as self
|(documentary feature)
|-
|rowspan="2"| 2016
|Midnight Delight
|Lead
|(feature - won several awards)
|-
|WTF 
| 
|(feature - unreleased)
|-
|2014
|Bongo Killer Crown
|Dr. Louis
|(feature)
|-
|rowspan="3"|2013
|Cherry Pop
|Terry
|(short)
|-
|One City NIght
|Elevator Man
|(short)
|-
|Full Circle
|Goon 4
|(feature)
|-
|2012
|Life! Camera Action...|Mike
|(feature - won best supporting actor award)
|-
|rowspan="3"|2011
|Psycho-Path: Mania
|Dr. Ofori
|(feature)
|-
|He Said, She Said (a romantic comedy)|Uomo
|(feature)
|-
|Pariah 
|
|(feature)
|-
|2010
|Non Compos Mentis|Big Sha
|(feature)
|-
|}

Television

Accolades
Won, Best Supporting Actor - Life! Camera Action... @ 28th Goldie Film Awards, USA.
 Nominated, Best Supporting Actor - Life! Camera Action...@ Golden Door Film Festival, USA.

References

External links''

21st-century American male actors
African-American male actors
African-American male comedians
American male comedians
African-American stand-up comedians
American stand-up comedians
American male film actors
American male television actors
American male voice actors
Living people
Male actors from Jersey City, New Jersey
21st-century American comedians
Year of birth missing (living people)
21st-century African-American people